Vikramjit may refer to:

 Vikramaditya, legendary king of ancient India
 Vikramjit (Tomara dynasty), 16th century Indian ruler who died in the First Battle of Panipat
 Vikramjit Sahney, Indian entrepreneur, educationist and social worker
 Vikramjit Singh, Dutch cricketer
 Vikramjit Singh Rooprai, Indian activist and educationist